Miguel Lluch was a French-born Spanish art director, screenwriter and film director.

He was married to Swedish actress, TV producer and author Maria Gustafsson.

Selected filmography
 Forbidden Trade (1952)
 Lawless Mountain (1953)
 Fire in the Blood (1953)
 Sister Angelica (1954)
 Anchor Button (1961)
 La magnifica sfida (1965)

References

Bibliography 
 Pitts, Michael R. Western Movies: A Guide to 5,105 Feature Films. McFarland, 2012.

External links 
 

1922 births
2016 deaths
Spanish film directors
Spanish male screenwriters
Spanish art directors
French emigrants to Spain